Sarıtosun is a village in the Ovacık District, Tunceli Province, Turkey. The village is populated by Kurds of the Aslanan tribe and had a population of 24 in 2021.

The hamlets of Bakraçlı and Bük are attached to the village.

References 

Kurdish settlements in Tunceli Province
Villages in Ovacık District